Kuta is a surname and may be:

 László Kutas (born 1936), a Hungarian sculptor
 Ibrahim Kuta (1942–2008), a Nigerian politician
 Dahiru Awaisu Kuta (born 1949), a Nigerian politician
 Marta Kutas (born September 2, 1949), an American professor of cognitive science
 Charles Kuta (born 1956), an American computer engineer
 Stephen Robert Kuta (born 11 June 1978), a British author and historian